Prekaz may refer to several places:

 , in Kosovo; see List of populated places in Kosovo
 Prekaz i Epërm, in Kosovo; see List of populated places in Kosovo
 Attack on Prekaz, a 1998 operation during the Kosovo War, at Prekaz i Poshtëm